Thakur Dhirendra Singh (born 1 November 1966) is an Indian politician and a member of the 18th Uttar Pradesh Assembly and also 17th  Legislative Assembly of India. He represents the Jewar Assembly constituency of Uttar Pradesh and is a member of the Bharatiya Janata Party (BJP).

Early life and education 
Dhirendra Singh was born in Rabupura town of Gautam Budh Nagar district to Rajput family of Thakur Heeri Singh and Shanti Devi, with the family having a foothold in politics and agriculture. He attended the Chaudhary Charan Singh University and attained a Master of Arts degree in History. He is an alumnus of St. John's College, Agra.

Political career 
Dhirendra Singh started his political life as a student leader in St. John's College, Agra. After having got a membership in the Indian National Congress (INC), he served on many posts. He took active role during the farmers movement of Bhatta Parsaul and came to limelight during the land acquisition movement of Bhatta Parsaul when he took the Congress vice president Rahul Gandhi to the village on his bike, and led a massive protest. Dhirendra Singh raised a big movement to change the land acquisition law in India. He was the INC's candidate in assembly election 2012 but lost the seat by a low margin of votes. He quit the INC and joined BJP before the assembly polls of 2017 and was elected member of Uttar Pradesh Legislative Assembly for the first time. Dhirendra Singh has contested for the 16th, 17th and 18th Legislative Assembly for the third time in a row. His victory margin in this election is almost three times that of the 2017 election.

Jewar Airport 
The Uttar Pradesh government is constructing Noida International Airport in Jewar, for which land acquisition is proposed in the villages of Jewar area, but the local farmers did not want to give their land to the district administration of Gautam Buddh Nagar. Yamuna Expressway Industrial Development Authority (YEIDA) told the UP Govt, percentage of families that have consented to the land acquisition process is less than number mandated by the Right to Fair Compensation and Transparency in Land Acquisition, Rehabilitation and Resettlement (LARR) Act, 2013. Due to the lag in the acquisition, Singh intervened. The MLA visited the villages to campaign for advantages of the airport to the farmers. After this 26 farmers from Rohi, Banwari Bas, Dayanat Pur, Kishorpur villages and other hamlets in Jewar along with Dhirendra Singh met the CM Yogi Adityanath in Lucknow to ask for higher compensations for the land acquisition process.
Dhirendra Singh's priority is health and education in his second term as the Jewar MLA while he also plans to get locals trained for skills that could help them bag 40 per cent of the jobs at the Noida International Airport. He is a key negotiator with farmers for land acquisition for the Rs 29,560 crore airport project. Work has started on the second phase of the Noida International Airport being built in Jewar, for which 1,365 hectares of land is being acquired. Farmers whose land is earmarked for the Noida International Airport (NIA) project in Jewar staged a protest against the Uttar Pradesh government, demanding better compensation and rehabilitation package for their families. In such a situation, once again Dhirendra Singh went to Lucknow with the farmers of Jewar area to handle the situation and met Chief Minister Yogi Adityanath. The Chief Minister announced a one-time increase in compensation at the rate of Rs 1,000 per square metre. This increase is historically the highest for any development project not only in Uttar Pradesh but across the country.

References

Uttar Pradesh MLAs 2017–2022
Uttar Pradesh MLAs 2022–2027
1966 births
Living people
Bharatiya Janata Party politicians from Uttar Pradesh